The Mahogany Tree was a weekly literary magazine published from January until December 1892. The magazine was based in Boston.

Overview
The magazine was started by Mildred Aldrich, and it was supposedly "devoted solely to the 'fine arts'." According to a review in The Harvard Crimson its aim was to "give criticisms on books, pictures, music, and acting." It has since been described as "one of the first forums for decadent-aesthetic ideas in the United States."

Contributors comprised Philip Henry Savage, Ralph Adams Cram, Louise Imogen Guiney and F. Holland Day, amongst others. The magazine was the first to publish the work of Willa Cather.

References

1892 establishments in Massachusetts
1892 disestablishments in Massachusetts
Weekly magazines published in the United States
Decadent literature
Defunct literary magazines published in the United States
Magazines established in 1892
Magazines disestablished in 1892
Magazines published in Boston